Hammer Hill is a 140m hill above Ngau Chi Wan in New Kowloon, Hong Kong. The correct English translation of its Chinese name is "Axe Hill".

See also
 Geography of Hong Kong
 List of mountains, peaks and hills in Hong Kong

References

Mountains, peaks and hills of Hong Kong
Ngau Chi Wan
New Kowloon